Pappi is a 1934 German comedy film directed by Arthur Maria Rabenalt and starring Viktor de Kowa, Hilde Weissner and Petra Unkel. It is part of the circus film genre.

The film's sets were designed by the art director Hermann Warm.

Cast
Viktor de Kowa as Hans Werner
Hilde Weissner as Jenny Anderson
Petra Unkel as Lilly
Emilia Unda as Aunt Anna
Hans Deppe as Willibald Bisam
Hans Sternberg as Gastwirt Krüger
Josef Dahmen as Fred
Josef Sieber as Lehmann
Rudolf Platte as Der Mann
Herti Kirchner as Die Frau
Maria Krahn as Frau von Keller

References

External links

1934 comedy films
German comedy films
Films of Nazi Germany
Films directed by Arthur Maria Rabenalt
Circus films
German black-and-white films
Tobis Film films
1930s German films
1930s German-language films